Rodrigo Silva dos Santos or simply Rodrigo Broa (born April 13, 1981, in Imperatriz), is a Brazilian attacking midfielder. He currently plays for Flamengo.

Career
Rodrigo Silva dos Santos is revealed by a supporter who came to Remus and Flamengo in 2006 with the steering wheel Marabá.

Although revealed at the Remo, was the PA that rival Paysandu Rodrigo Broa, as it is called the player appeared definitively for football. His best performances for the club Para happened during the Brazilian Championship in 2005 when he formed a midfield featured alongside a young wheel Maraba, good matches and the duo caught the attention of big Brazilian clubs, especially the Flemish.

Thus, in 2006, were presented together, Rodrigo Broa and Maraba. Rodrigo signed a four-year, and unlike that of Maraba even acted in a competitive match, even had a few chances in the team, but will not please the coaching staff, losing ground to other players later.

Also in 2006, the year of his arrival, he was loaned to Club Sport of Recife, which disputed the Campeonato Brasileiro Serie B, and even wanted to buy it at the end of the loan agreement, however, and a contractual disagreement with the player, the made a pilgrimage back to Flamengo, this time to play no more, and go directly to the Fortress, again on loan.

Fulfilled without much sparkle, his contract with the Fort until the end of the 2007 season when once again for Flamengo on loan, this time to Caxias, who defended the club in 2008.

In 2009, he returned to Flamengo and lived in expectation of being noticed by the coach Cuca, which did not happen. Rejected by the football department Rodrigo began to train separately to receive the loan proposal Campinense that had risen to Serie B in the Brazilian Championship. The supporter went on to play alongside Negron, former Flamengo striker folk, who also defended the club that season Northeast. Together, incidentally, were demoted to Serie C in the Brazilian Championship.

For the 2010 season, the year he would end his contract with Flamengo, Broa hung the Campinense and without even going through the Gavia, returned to Para and signed on loan with the Águia de Marabá.

Career statistics
(Correct )

according to combined sources on the Flamengo official website and Flaestatística.

Honours
 Paysandu
Campeonato Paraense: 2005
 Flamengo
Copa do Brasil: 2006
 Fortaleza
Campeonato Cearense: 2007

References

External links

1981 births
Living people
Brazilian footballers
Clube do Remo players
Paysandu Sport Club players
CR Flamengo footballers
Sport Club do Recife players
Fortaleza Esporte Clube players
Águia de Marabá Futebol Clube players
Association football forwards
Association football midfielders
People from Imperatriz
Sportspeople from Maranhão